Gilbert Rankin (20 March 1870 – 28 November 1927) was a Scottish footballer who played as an inside forward.

Career
Born in Alexandria, Rankin played club football locally for Vale of Leven (featuring on the losing side in the 1890 Scottish Cup Final) and Renton, but quit the game aged 25, later moving to England. He scored three times in two appearances for Scotland, with a hat-trick on his debut against Ireland in 1890.

See also
 List of Scotland national football team hat-tricks

Notes

References

1870 births
1927 deaths
Scottish footballers
Scotland international footballers
Vale of Leven F.C. players
Renton F.C. players
Scottish Football League players
Association football inside forwards
People from Alexandria, West Dunbartonshire
Footballers from West Dunbartonshire